Sarson's is a brand of malt vinegar brewed in the United Kingdom. It is sold in pear shaped bottles with a flip top and the brand is currently owned by Mizkan. Sarson's also produces vinegar for Sainsbury's,  3663,  Chef, Independent and Mizkan.

History and uses 
The vinegar was first brewed by Thomas Sarson in 1794 from malt barley. James Thomas Sarson was a vinegar maker living at Brunswick Place, Shoreditch in 1841. Sales rocketed when his son Henry James Sarson took over. It was renamed "Sarson's Virgin Vinegar" in 1884, referencing a Biblical story of The Wise and Foolish Virgins, by which he was inspired, as opposed to the purity of the product, but this name was soon dropped. In 1893, the company was trading under the name of Henry Sarson and Sons from "The Vinegar Works", Catherine Street, City Road, Shoreditch, London. Two of Henry's sons, Henry Logsdail Sarson and Percival Stanley Sarson also joined the family business as vinegar brewers.

The Sarson's Vinegar factory was situated in Tanner Street in Bermondsey, London, on the southern approach to Tower Bridge, where you could smell the aroma of the vinegar.

In 1932 the company merged with other British vinegar producers to form British Vinegars Ltd. In 1968, British Vinegars purchased a site from the Co-op in Middleton, Greater Manchester and production moved there.

The Tanner Street factory was closed, and the building and factory were used for storage. Starting in 2000, parts of the site were redeveloped for flats. Old and new parts of the factory were subsequently merged to form new buildings and offices. Remaining buildings were removed. There was also an additional factory in Stourport-on-Severn, now closed.

The company was taken over by Crosse & Blackwell which in turn was taken over by Nestlé but sold to Premier Foods. Premier Foods agreed in July 2012 to sell its Sarson's, Haywards pickled onion and Dufrais vinegar brands to Mizkan – a 200-year-old vinegar manufacturer  in Japan – for £41m as part of a streamlining programme.

Advertising 
A print of a cartoon dates from 1893 entitled "The Irony of Circumstance", featuring 'acetic faced women' in front of sign which reads "Virgin Vinegar".

A Sarson's Virgin Vinegar colour advertisement postcard survives from the 1900s for a campaign entitled "She would have Sarsons". And from the 1930s and 1940s there is a photograph of a Sarson's vinegar truck and 49 photographs of the works, in a collection created by British Vinegars Limited and are held in the London Metropolitan Archives.

The slogan used to advertise the product is "Don't say vinegar - say Sarson's".

Varieties 
Malt and Distilled Vinegar
Lemon Vinegar
Light Malt Vinegar
Pickling Strength Malt Vinegar

Other products 
Worcester sauce
Soy sauce
Gravy browning

References

External links

British condiments
Brand name condiments
British brands
Mizkan brands
Vinegar